George Major (born 26 October 1939) is a British former motorcycle speedway rider.

Biography
Born in Donnington, Oxfordshire, Major's first speedway experience was riding on a track built on a rubbish tip in his home town. He made his competitive debut in 1959 for Aldershot Shots in the Southern Area League. In the early 1960s he rode for Yarmouth Bloaters, Newcastle Diamonds, Neath Welsh Dragons, St Austell Gulls, and Norwich Stars before riding for his home town club, Oxford Cheetahs in 1963 and 1964. In 1964 he signed for Cradley Heathens, and was the team's top scorer in 1964 before riding with them in the first season of the British League the following year, in which he averaged over 7.5 points per match. After two seasons with Sheffield Tigers he signed for Leicester Lions in 1968, before returning to Oxford  in the 1969 season after injury saw him lose his place in the Lions team. In 1970, no longer a high points scorer at the top level, he dropped down to the second division with Doncaster Stallions, averaging over 9.5 over the season, with 4 maximum points scores. Four seasons with Birmingham Brummies followed, in which he captained the team and continued to score highly in the second division, before retiring at the end of the 1975 season.

Major represented Britain in 1963 and 1964 in Test matches against an Overseas team, and England in 1964 against Scotland. He competed in the first British Final in 1965, finishing thirteenth. He competed in the Second Division Riders Final in 1971 and 1972, finishing seventh and ninth respectively.

References

1939 births
Living people
British speedway riders
English motorcycle racers
Sportspeople from Oxford
Aldershot Shots riders
Yarmouth Bloaters riders
Newcastle Diamonds riders
Neath Welsh Dragons riders
St Austell Gulls riders
Oxford Cheetahs riders
Norwich Stars riders
Cradley Heathens riders
Sheffield Tigers riders
Leicester Lions riders
Doncaster Stallions riders
Newport Wasps riders
Birmingham Brummies riders
Glasgow Tigers riders
Belle Vue Aces riders
Wolverhampton Wolves riders
Halifax Dukes riders
Coventry Bees riders
King's Lynn Stars riders